Piazurini is a tribe of true weevils in the beetle family Curculionidae. There are about 12 genera and more than 400 described species in Piazurini.

Genera
These 12 genera belong to the tribe Piazurini:

 Costolatychus Heller, 1906
 Cratosomus Schoenherr, 1825
 Guiomatus Faust, 1899
 Hedycera Pascoe, 1870
 Latychellus Hustache, 1938
 Latychus Pascoe, 1872
 Lobops Schoenherr, 1845
 Piazolechriops Heller, 1906
 Piazurus Schoenherr, 1825
 Pinarus Schoenherr, 1826
 Pseudopiazurus Heller, 1906
 Pseudopinarus Heller, 1906

References

Further reading

 
 
 
 

Weevils
Beetle tribes